35th NSFC Awards
January 6, 2001

Best Film: 
 Yi Yi 

The 35th National Society of Film Critics Awards, given on 6 January 2001, honored the best in film for 2000.

Winners

Best Picture 
1. Yi Yi
2. Traffic
3. The House of Mirth

Best Director 
1. Steven Soderbergh – Traffic and Erin Brockovich
2. Edward Yang – Yi Yi
3. Ang Lee – Crouching Tiger, Hidden Dragon (Wo hu cang long)

Best Actor 
1. Javier Bardem – Before Night Falls
2. Mark Ruffalo – You Can Count on Me
3. Tom Hanks – Cast Away

Best Actress 
1. Laura Linney – You Can Count on Me
2. Gillian Anderson – The House of Mirth
3. Ellen Burstyn – Requiem for a Dream

Best Supporting Actor 
1. Benicio del Toro – Traffic
2. Fred Willard – Best in Show
3. Willem Dafoe – Shadow of the Vampire

Best Supporting Actress 
1. Elaine May – Small Time Crooks
2. Frances McDormand – Almost Famous and Wonder Boys
3. Marcia Gay Harden – Pollock

Best Screenplay 
1. Kenneth Lonergan – You Can Count on Me
2. Steve Kloves – Wonder Boys
3. Stephen Gaghan – Traffic

Best Cinematography 
1. Agnès Godard – Beau Travail
2. Peter Pau – Crouching Tiger, Hidden Dragon (Wo hu cang long)
2. Steven Soderbergh – Traffic

Best Non-Fiction Film 
1. The Life and Times of Hank Greenberg
2. Dark Days
3. The Original Kings of Comedy

Experimental Film Award 
 The Heart of the World

Film Heritage Award 
 The National Film Preservation Foundation for "Treasures from American Film Archives," its four-DVD anthology of 50 films, "for preserving and propagating a body of films of cultural and historical significance, with an emphasis on non-Hollywood films."

Special Citation 
 Michelangelo Antonioni

References

External links
 Past Awards

2000 film awards
2000
2001 in American cinema